Kimo Leopoldo (born January 4, 1968), or simply Kimo, is an American retired mixed martial artist and actor. He made his MMA debut at UFC 3 in 1994 losing to Royce Gracie by submission. A professional from 1994 until 2011, he also competed in the PRIDE Fighting Championships, Cage Rage, and the World Fighting Alliance.

He was credited with a black belt in taekwondo in his Ultimate Fighting Championship debut at UFC 3.

Background
Leopoldo was born in Munich to an American father of Irish and Polynesian descent and a German mother of Jewish descent. Four months after he was born his family moved to Hawaii. Leopoldo was a natural athlete growing up, playing football, wrestling, and he also had an interest in surfing. Leopoldo was a dominant wrestler at Waianae High School and played on the team that won the Hawaii High School Athletic Association Championship. Leopoldo was also a very talented middle linebacker in football, and attended the University of Washington on a partial athletic scholarship, but he was unprepared for college, and returned to Hawaii shortly after.

In Huntington Beach, California, he sought to renew his career in football. Going under the name "Kim Leopold" he quickly became an NJCAA All-American and gained interest from many Division I colleges. However, he tore both of his ACLs, and his success only lasted until the middle of his sophomore year. Depressed and with seemingly no future, he met Joe Son and turned to mixed martial arts after studying films of fights including UFC 1, among other fights featuring Royce Gracie, who Leopoldo would later make his debut against.

Mixed martial arts career
At UFC 3, billed as a taekwondo fighter, Kimo fought the reigning, defending UFC 1 and UFC 2 champion Royce Gracie in the first round. Although Gracie tried to take him down at all costs, Kimo stayed firmly on his feet, and even managed to capture his back in a failed trip. Royce reversed it and mounted him, but only briefly, as Kimo flipped Gracie over and landed multiple headbutts through his guard. The Brazilian fighter then grabbed Kimo's ponytail in an attempt to get the advantage, but it didn't stop Kimo from taking his back again standing. Finally, Royce pulled him down and locked an armbar, making Leopoldo submit. Even though Kimo lost, Royce couldn't fight two other bouts he had that night, and had to forfeit his match against Harold Howard. Kimo and his cornermen Joe Son featured a controversial moment that very night, when they jumped on the cage after Royce's forfeiting and started celebrating among the audience's chants.

After four straight wins in Japan, including a dominant win over UFC 2 finalist Pat Smith, Kimo returned at UFC 8 and fought reigning UFC champion Ken Shamrock in a title match for the UFC Superfight Championship, but lost early in the fight via submission due to a kneebar.

Kimo then fought at the UFC's Ultimate Ultimate 1996. He won his first fight against UFC 7 finalist Paul Varelans, but withdrew from the tournament after the win due to exhaustion.

He then traveled to Japan and fought the former 3 time UFC champion Dan Severn in the inaugural Pride Fighting Championships event. A controversial contest, it took place primarily standing with both fighters nullifying the other's ability to strike. At the end of the contest Severn attempted to take Kimo down, however was unable because Kimo held onto the ropes. At the 29th minute Severn landed a take down, however it was a matter of too little too late and the contest was deemed a draw. Upon the final bell, commentator Stephen 'The Fight Professor' Quadros said 'the best thing about this fight is Dan Severn's post fight look', and in response to the Japanese crowd uncharacteristically booing, he said 'they're booing because they're relieved it's over'.

Kimo then returned for UFC 16 and fought top Japanese fighter Tsuyoshi Kohsaka. Kimo began the contest aggressive, securing a strong takedown and controlling Kohsaka for the first six and a half minutes. Kimo then began to fatigue and Kohsaka took advantage, restoring the fight back to its feet, before landing a stiff right jab to the face of Kimo. Clearly stunned by the punch, momentum immediately swung in Kohsaka's favour. Although Kimo held on for the remainder of the bout, Kohsaka won via unanimous decision, out scoring Kimo in striking, grappling, and octagon control.

After a four-year break from mixed martial arts, Kimo won a warm up fight against Tim Lajcik in the WFA in 2002. He then again returned to the UFC at UFC 43, where he quickly defeated David "Tank" Abbott by arm triangle choke. Kimo went on to fight in the main event of UFC 48, where he fought Ken Shamrock in a rematch. Kimo was knocked out in the first round from knees to the head.  After the fight Kimo, tested positive for the steroid Stanozolol, also known as Winstrol, among other drugs.  He was suspended for six months and fined $5,000 by the Nevada State Athletic Commission.

Kimo was to fight Bas Rutten at WFA: King of the Streets on July 22, 2006.  However, he was forced off the card by the California State Athletic Commission, after testing positive for Stanozolol once again.

In his two most recent fights, Kimo lost to Dave Legeno by a guillotine choke submission. He then lost to Wes Sims by TKO in X-1.

Kickboxing career 
Kimo made his kickboxing debut on March 3, 1995 at the K-1 Grand Prix '95 Opening Battle event in Tokyo, where he fought former world champion Masaaki Satake for the opportunity to compete in the K-1 Grand Prix '95 tournament. Kimo started aggressively, keeping his opponent on the defensive with powerful hooks. He tired as the round went on, allowing Satake to strike back with kicks to his head and body. In the second round, Satake scored three knockdowns over Kimo and thus earned a TKO victory.

Leopoldo competed again eight years later at the K-1 World Grand Prix 2003 in Las Vegas II event. He faced rising super heavyweight Bob Sapp in what turned out to be a brutal and controversial fight. As Sapp came forward with clubbing punches and knees, Kimo fought back with countering hooks, and the two fighters exchanged knockdowns in the first round. Sapp proved more dominant in the following round, swarming the UFC veteran before knocking him out with a rabbit punch. Despite Kimo's loss, the Las Vegas crowd cheered his name and booed Sapp in the aftermath. Referee Nobuaki Kakuda faced criticism for not penalizing Sapp's blatant foul and for allowing Sapp time to recover after failing to answer the bell for the second round.

Fighting his final kickboxing match to date at K-1 Burning 2004, Kimo endured a knockout loss to former amateur boxing champion Hiromi Amada. His current record stands at 0–3.

Acting career 
Leopoldo has worked since 1996 as an actor in independent productions. He starred in the Femme Fatales episode "Family Business", the direct to video production R.I.O.T.: The Movie and the films The Process, The Dog Problem, In the Closet, Bullet and Avengers Grimm.

Personal life 
In February 2009 Leopoldo was arrested in Tustin, California for possession of a controlled substance. In the police report Leopoldo was standing by his car, wearing sandals, playing with a yo-yo, and donning a Long Beach Police Department jumpsuit that can only be worn by the motor pool mechanics.

Various media outlets reported that Leopoldo had died from complications from a heart attack at age 41. Kevin Iole of Yahoo Sports reported on his Twitter that Leopoldo's publicist refuted reports that Leopoldo was in Costa Rica and instead was seen alive in Orange County the night before.  At a July 21, 2009 press conference Leopoldo denied anyone close to him created the rumor, he also expressed his desire to return to fight one last time.

Kimo is well known for his Christian beliefs: he sports many religious tattoos, and entered the arena at UFC 3 carrying a large cross on his back.

Mixed martial arts record 

|-
| Loss
| align=center| 11–7–1
| Wes Sims
| TKO (punches)
| Extreme Wars 5: Battlegrounds
| 
| align=center| 1
| align=center| 3:21
| Honolulu, Hawaii, United States
| 
|-
| Loss
| align=center| 11–6–1
| Dave Legeno
| Submission (guillotine choke)
| Cage Rage 18
| 
| align=center| 1
| align=center| 3:21
| London, England
| 
|-
| Loss
| align=center| 11–5–1
| Ikuhisa Minowa
| Submission (achilles lock)
| Pride Bushido 8
| 
| align=center| 1
| align=center| 3:11
| Nagoya, Japan
| 
|-
| Win
| align=center| 11–4–1
| Marcus Royster
| Submission (forearm choke)
| Rumble on the Rock 7
| 
| align=center| 1
| align=center| 4:18
| Honolulu, Hawaii, United States
| 
|-
| Loss
| align=center| 10–4–1
| Ken Shamrock
| KO (knee)
| UFC 48
| 
| align=center| 1
| align=center| 1:26
| Las Vegas, Nevada, United States
| 
|-
| Win
| align=center| 10–3–1
| Tank Abbott
| Submission (arm-triangle choke)
| UFC 43
| 
| align=center| 1
| align=center| 1:59
| Las Vegas, Nevada, United States
| 
|-
| Win
| align=center| 9–3–1
| Tim Lajcik
| TKO (broken toe)
| WFA 2: Level 2
| 
| align=center| 1
| align=center| 1:55
| Las Vegas, Nevada, United States
| 
|-
| Loss
| align=center| 8–3–1
| Tsuyoshi Kohsaka
| Decision (unanimous)
| UFC 16
| 
| align=center| 1
| align=center| 15:00
| Kenner, Louisiana, United States
| 
|-
| Draw
| align=center| 8–2–1
| Dan Severn
| Draw
| PRIDE 1
| 
| align=center| 1 
| align=center| 30:00
| Tokyo, Japan
| 
|-
| Win
| align=center| 8–2
| Brian Johnston
| Submission (forearm choke)
| Ultimate Explosion
| 
| align=center| 1 
| align=center| 1:43
| Honolulu, Hawaii, United States
| 
|-
| Win
| align=center| 7–2
| Paul Varelans
| TKO (corner stoppage)
| Ultimate Ultimate 1996
| 
| align=center| 1 
| align=center| 9:08
| Birmingham, Alabama, United States
| 
|-
| Win
| align=center| 6–2
| Scott Bigelow
| Submission (rear-naked choke)
| U-Japan
| 
| align=center| 1 
| align=center| 2:15
| Japan
| 
|-
| Win
| align=center| 5–2
| Kazushi Sakuraba
| Submission (arm-triangle choke)
| Shoot Boxing – S-Cup 1996
| 
| align=center| 1 
| align=center| 4:20
| Tokyo, Japan
| 
|-
| Loss
| align=center| 4–2
| Ken Shamrock
| Submission (kneebar)
| UFC 8
| 
| align=center| 1 
| align=center| 4:24
| San Juan, Puerto Rico
| 
|-
| Win
| align=center| 4–1
| Yoshihiro Takayama
| Submission (rear-naked choke)
| Meiji Jingu Stadium Open Air MMA
| 
| align=center| 1
| align=center| 1:20
| Tokyo, Japan
|
|-
| Win
| align=center| 3–1
| Patrick Smith
| TKO (submission to punches)
| United Full Contact Federation 1
| 
| align=center| 1 
| align=center| 2:59
| Sapporo, Japan
| 
|-
| Win
| align=center| 2–1
| Fred Floyd
| Submission (rear-naked choke)
| United Full Contact Federation 1
| 
| align=center| 1 
| align=center| 0:47
| Sapporo, Japan
| 
|-
| Win
| align=center| 1–1
| Patrick Smith
| TKO (submission to punches)
| K-1 Legend
| 
| align=center| 1 
| align=center| 3:00
| Nagoya, Japan
| 
|-
| Loss
| align=center| 0–1
| Royce Gracie
| Submission (armlock)
| UFC 3
| 
| align=center| 1 
| align=center| 4:40
| Charlotte, North Carolina, United States
|

Kickboxing record

Legend:

References

External links

1968 births
Living people
American people of German descent
American people of Polynesian descent
American male kickboxers
Kickboxers from Hawaii
Heavyweight kickboxers
American male mixed martial artists
American Muay Thai practitioners
Mixed martial artists from Hawaii
Heavyweight mixed martial artists
Mixed martial artists utilizing Muay Thai
Mixed martial artists utilizing taekwondo
Mixed martial artists utilizing pankration
Mixed martial artists utilizing collegiate wrestling
Mixed martial artists utilizing Brazilian jiu-jitsu
American practitioners of Brazilian jiu-jitsu
People awarded a black belt in Brazilian jiu-jitsu
American male taekwondo practitioners
American male sport wrestlers
American sportspeople in doping cases
Doping cases in mixed martial arts
Christians from Hawaii
Ultimate Fighting Championship male fighters